Hugues-Wilfried Hamed Dah (born 10 July 1986) is a Burkinabé international footballer who plays for Emirati team Al-Thaid, as a striker.

Club career
Born in Ouagadougou, Dah has played club football in Burkina Faso, Equatorial Guinea, Gabon, Cameroon, Bahrain, United Arab Emirates and Oman for ASFA Yennenga, Renacimiento, FC 105 Libreville, Coton Sport, Busaiteen, Al Urooba, Al Nahda, Al-Thaid, EGS Gafsa, EO Sidi Bouzid and Salitas FC.

International career
He made his international debut for Burkina Faso in 2012.

References

1986 births
Living people
Burkinabé footballers
Burkina Faso international footballers
ASFA Yennenga players
Renacimiento FC players
FC 105 Libreville players
Coton Sport FC de Garoua players
Busaiteen Club players
Al Urooba Club players
Al-Nahda Club (Oman) players
Al Dhaid SC players
EGS Gafsa players
EO Sidi Bouzid players
Burkinabé Premier League players
Gabon Championnat National D1 players
Elite One players
UAE First Division League players
Tunisian Ligue Professionnelle 1 players
Association football forwards
Burkinabé expatriate footballers
Burkinabé expatriate sportspeople in Equatorial Guinea
Expatriate footballers in Equatorial Guinea
Burkinabé expatriate sportspeople in Gabon
Expatriate footballers in Gabon
Burkinabé expatriate sportspeople in Cameroon
Expatriate footballers in Cameroon
Burkinabé expatriate sportspeople in Bahrain
Expatriate footballers in Bahrain
Burkinabé expatriate sportspeople in the United Arab Emirates
Expatriate footballers in the United Arab Emirates
Burkinabé expatriate sportspeople in Oman
Expatriate footballers in Oman
Burkinabé expatriate sportspeople in Tunisia
Expatriate footballers in Tunisia
2013 Africa Cup of Nations players
Salitas FC players
21st-century Burkinabé people